Krohnsminde kunstgressbane is a municipality-owned sports ground and football stadium located in the city of Bergen, Norway, near Danmarks plass in the borough of Årstad. It was the home of the football club Løv-Ham until 2008. The western terrace of Krohnsminde kunstgressbane was demolished in November/December 2008 to make room for a new hospital building.

The terrace was designed by the architect Ole Landmark and finished in 1947. The venue has hosted the Norwegian Athletics Championships in 1950, 1957 and 1961. In the 1991 season, it hosted the 11 home matches for Fyllingen in the Norwegian Premier League.

References
  
  

Football venues in Norway
Eliteserien venues
Sports venues in Bergen
1947 establishments in Norway
Sports venues completed in 1947